Regil may refer to:

 Marco Antonio Regil (born 1969), Mexican actor, television personality and game show host
 Regil, a small village in Winford, a civil parish in the Chew Valley, Somerset, England